Menippe  may refer to:
 Menippe (Greek mythology)
 188 Menippe, an asteroid
 Menippe (crab), a genus of crab